Franklin Crisostomo Taveras Fabian (born December 24, 1949), is a former Major League shortstop from  to  for the Pittsburgh Pirates, New York Mets and Montreal Expos.

Career

Pittsburgh Pirates
Taveras signed with the Pittsburgh Pirates as an amateur free agent January 8, and made his major league debut on September 25,  as a pinch runner for Willie Stargell in the fifteenth inning of an extra inning marathon with the New York Mets (won 2-1 by the Mets in the bottom of the 15th). On August 5, he hit an inside-the-park grand slam in the second inning of the second game of a doubleheader at Cincinnati. Taveras led the National League in stolen bases in 1977 with 70, and followed that up with leading the NL in times caught stealing with 25 in 1978. In an unfortunate set of circumstances, he was not given a World Series ring in 1971 after the Pirates won because he was not listed on any post-season roster. He also didn't receive a World Series ring when the Pirates won in 1979 because he was traded just weeks into the season to the New York Mets.

New York Mets
Eleven games into the  season, Taveras was traded to the New York Mets for Tim Foli and minor leaguer Greg Field on April 19. During his first season with the Mets, he hit his only career home run that actually went over the wall against Mike LaCoss. Coincidentally, it too was in Cincinnati.  Taveras managed to play in 164 regular season games that year.

Montreal Expos
The Mets traded Taveras to the Montreal Expos for pitcher Steve Ratzer prior to the start of the  season. With Montreal, Taveras made his Major League debut as a second baseman. He was released on August 13 after compiling only a .161 batting average in 48 games.

See also
 List of Major League Baseball career stolen bases leaders
 List of Major League Baseball annual stolen base leaders

References

External links

1949 births
Águilas Cibaeñas players
Charleston Charlies players
Clinton Pilots players
Dominican Republic expatriate baseball players in Canada
Dominican Republic expatriate baseball players in the United States
Gastonia Pirates players
Geneva Pirates players
Gulf Coast Pirates players

Living people
Major League Baseball players from the Dominican Republic
Major League Baseball shortstops
Montreal Expos players
National League stolen base champions
New York Mets players
Pittsburgh Pirates players
Salem Rebels players
Waterbury Pirates players